Court uniform and dress may refer to:

Court uniform and dress in the United Kingdom
Court uniform and dress in the Empire of Japan
Court uniform and dress in the Ottoman Empire

See also
Court dress